Concord West railway station is located on the Main Northern line, serving the Sydney suburb of Concord West. It is served by the Sydney Trains T9 Northern Line services.

History

Concord West station was opened on 1 September 1887 as Concord. In March 1892, a second platform was added when the Main Northern line was duplicated. In June 1909, it was renamed Concord West. In 1911, a third line was laid to the west of the station and a signal box added, with a platform face added by 1940.

During the 2000 Olympics, Concord West was used as an alternate station to access Sydney Olympic Park for services from the Central Coast, with the platforms being extended to enable Intercity trains to make an additional stop. A temporary footbridge and an extra station exit were also provided, but were removed after the Olympics.

Platform 4 is signalled for bi-directional working, and for a time was used as the Sydney stopping point for the now-defunct Great South Pacific Express. It is primarily used by freight trains.

A fourth track was laid to the east of the existing tracks as part of the Northern Sydney Freight Corridor project. As part of these works, Concord West received an Easy Access upgrade and an additional platform. A new overhead concourse with lifts opened on 26 October 2014, replacing the existing concourse. The existing eastern platform was converted to an island platform. The new platform (numbered 1) opened on 9 June 2015 and the existing platforms were renumbered.

Platforms and services

References

External links

Concord West station details Transport for New South Wales

Easy Access railway stations in Sydney
Railway stations in Sydney
Railway stations in Australia opened in 1887
Main North railway line, New South Wales
City of Canada Bay